Krombia venturalis is a species of moth in the family Crambidae. It is found in France.

References

Moths described in 1982
Cybalomiinae
Moths of Europe